The 1933 Monaco Grand Prix was a Grand Prix motor race held at the Circuit de Monaco on 23 April 1933.

This was the first Grand Prix where grid positions were decided by practice time rather than the established method of balloting. Achille Varzi and Tazio Nuvolari exchanged the lead many times during the race and the race was settled in Varzi's favour on the final lap when Nuvolari's car caught fire due to over-revving. Nuvolari was then disqualified due to outside assistance while attempting to push his car to the finish.

Classification

Race

Starting grid positions

References

External links

Monaco Grand Prix
Monaco Grand Prix
Grand Prix